Enock Kisakye (born April 26, 1991), better known as Producer Eno Beats, is a Ugandan music producer. He is the Chief executive officer at Eno Beats Production Limited  located in Makindye, Kampala. Eno has worked with most of Uganda's top musicians including Bebe Cool, DR Jose Chameleone, Sheebah Karungi, Eddy Kenzo,  among others. He was nominated in the All Africa Music Awards 2018 as Best Audio Producer and he won the HIPIPO MUSIC AWARDS as Audio Producer of the Year 2018. He produce Stani Tonkema by Sheebah Karungi, Tatizo by Chameleone, Katono by Bebe Cool. Wankona by Sheebah Karungi

Awards
 2018 HIPIPO MUSIC AWARDS: Audio Producer of the Year

References

1991 births
Living people
Ugandan record producers